Rice Bazaar is a wholesale market for different kinds of rice, located in the heart of City of Thrissur in Kerala state of India. The market traces its origin around 200 years ago.

References

Bazaars in India
Economy of Thrissur
Rice
Wholesale markets in India